Carlo Pellegrini (1613 – 3 May 1678) was a Roman Catholic prelate who served as Bishop of Avellino e Frigento (1673–1678).

Biography
In 1613, Carlo Pellegrini was born in Castrovillari, Italy. On 13 March 1673, he was appointed during the papacy of Pope Clement X as Bishop of Avellino e Frigento. On 16 April 1673, he was consecrated bishop by Francesco Maria Febei, Titular Archbishop of Tarsus, with Pier Antonio Capobianco, Bishop Emeritus of Lacedonia, and Giuseppe di Giacomo, Bishop of Bovino, serving as co-consecrators. He served as Bishop of Avellino e Frigento until his death on 3 May 1678.

References

External links and additional sources
 (for Chronology of Bishops) 
 (for Chronology of Bishops) 

1613 births
1678 deaths
17th-century Italian Roman Catholic bishops
Bishops appointed by Pope Clement X